Events from the year 1527 in India.

Events
 March 17 – The Battle of Khanwa is fought.

Births

Deaths
 Hasan Khan Mewati, commander in the Battle of Khanwa is killed at that battle (year of birth unknown)

See also

 Timeline of Indian history

References